Artyom Aleksandrovich Kulishev (born 26 August 1993) is a Russian professional football player. He plays for FC Shinnik Yaroslavl.

Club career
He made his debut in the Russian Premier League on 3 August 2013 for FC Rostov in a game against FC Anzhi Makhachkala.

Honours

Individual
 2017–18 Russian Football National League top scorer with FC Dynamo Saint Petersburg: 17 goals.

External links

References

1993 births
Sportspeople from Rostov-on-Don
Living people
Russian footballers
Association football midfielders
FC Rostov players
FC Vityaz Podolsk players
FC Dynamo Saint Petersburg players
FC Orenburg players
FC Chayka Peschanokopskoye players
FC Fakel Voronezh players
FC Urozhay Krasnodar players
FC Shinnik Yaroslavl players
Russian Premier League players
Russian First League players
Russian Second League players